Elijah was a prophet in Israel in the 9th century BCE.

Elijah may also refer to:

Arts and entertainment
 Elijah (Lorenzetto), a 16th-century sculpture by Lorenzetto
 Elijah (oratorio), an 1846 composition by Felix Mendelssohn
 "Elijah" (High Maintenance), a 2013 television episode
 "Elijah", a 1978 song by Head East from Head East
 "Elijah", a 2019 song by Blood Red Shoes from Get Tragic

People
 Elijah (given name), a list of people and fictional characters
 Lee Elijah (born 1990), South Korean actress
 Samuel Elijah (born 1969), Nigerian footballer
 Soffiyah Elijah, American lawyer, author, and social justice activist
 Zebulon Elijah (1836/1838–1910), American formerly enslaved person who became a Florida politician

Places
 Elijah, Missouri, US, an unincorporated community
 Mount Elijah, a geographic feature within Oregon Caves National Monument and Preserve

See also
 Elias (disambiguation)